Ludwig Durek (27 January 1921 – 14 April 2000) was an Austrian international footballer. He was also part of Austria's squad for the football tournament at the 1948 Summer Olympics, but he did not play in any matches.

References

1921 births
2000 deaths
Association football forwards
Austrian footballers
Germany international footballers
Austria international footballers
SK Sturm Graz players
SK Sturm Graz managers
DSV Leoben managers
German footballers
German football managers
Dual internationalists (football)